East Vidette is a  mountain summit located two miles west of the crest of the Sierra Nevada mountain range, in the northeast corner of Tulare County in northern California. The John Muir Trail traverses below the north and east aspects of this remote peak. The first ascent of the summit was made in 1910 by a Sierra Club party via the East Ridge.

Etymology
Vidette is an alternative spelling of vedette, which is a mounted sentry for bringing information, giving signals, or warnings of danger, to a main body of troops. The pyramid-shaped East Vidette appears to stand guard above a valley, which inspired 
members of the Sierra Club to name it: "Two of these promontories, standing guard, as it were, the one at the entrance to the valley and the other just within it, form a striking pair, and we named them the Videttes."

Climate
According to the Köppen climate classification system, East Vidette is located in an alpine climate zone. Most weather fronts originate in the Pacific Ocean, and travel east toward the Sierra Nevada mountains. As fronts approach, they are forced upward by the peaks, causing them to drop their moisture in the form of rain or snowfall onto the range (orographic lift). Precipitation runoff from the mountain drains into Bubbs Creek, a tributary of the South Fork Kings River.

Gallery

See also

 West Vidette
 List of mountain peaks of California

References

External links
 East Vidette: YouTube
 Weather forecast: East Vidette
 East Vidette photo by Ansel Adams
 East Vidette photo: Flickr

Mountains of Tulare County, California
Mountains of Kings Canyon National Park
North American 3000 m summits
Mountains of Northern California
Sierra Nevada (United States)